James Joseph Hickey (born October 12, 1961) is an American professional baseball pitching coach for the Washington Nationals of Major League Baseball (MLB). Hickey was the previously the pitching coach for the Tampa Bay Rays, Chicago Cubs, and Houston Astros.

Career

Playing career
After graduating from Kennedy High School in Chicago, Illinois, Hickey played college baseball for the University of Texas–Pan American. He went 16–2 in 19 starts with a 1.66 earned run average (ERA) and helped his team win 64 games, a school record. That season, his senior year, his 16 victories led all NCAA baseball. In that season, of his 19 starts he recorded 16 complete games; those 16 complete games were the third largest single season total in NCAA history at the time, and still rank 4th all-time. While at Pan American he was a member of Phi Sigma Kappa fraternity.

The Chicago White Sox selected Hickey in the 13th round of the 1983 MLB draft. In , Hickey pitched for the Double-A San Antonio Missions in the Los Angeles Dodgers organization. In , he played for the Double-A Columbus Mudcats in the Houston Astros organization in the final year of his playing career.

Coaching career

In , Hickey was promoted to pitching coach for the Astros' Triple-A affiliate, the New Orleans Zephyrs. That year, the Zephyrs won the first-ever Triple-A World Series, pitting the Pacific Coast League (PCL) champion against the International League champion. In , the Zephyrs had the second-best ERA in the PCL (3.75 to Tacoma's 3.74) en route to the Pacific Coast League championship. In 2002, Hickey was named a coach for the All-Star Futures Game in Milwaukee and also was a member of the coaching staff for the Triple-A All-Star Game. At the end of the 2002 season, he was named the Astros Player Development Man of the Year.

Hickey was announced as the interim pitching coach for Houston on July 14, and was named the full-time pitching coach in October 2004 after 14 seasons as a pitching coach in their minor leagues and seven with the Zephyrs.

In his first year with Houston, he helped the pitching staff which included Roger Clemens, Brad Lidge, Roy Oswalt and Brandon Backe advance to the 2004 National League Championship Series. In , the Astros advanced to the World Series, with Clemens (1st), Andy Pettitte (2nd), and Roy Oswalt (7th) in the National League in ERA. Houston was also second overall in the NL with a 3.51 ERA in 2005, and led the league with the fewest runs and walks allowed.

On November 18, Hickey was announced as the new pitching coach for the Tampa Bay Rays, replacing Mike Butcher. After the 2017 regular season, the Tampa Bay Rays and Hickey parted ways.

In the 2017 offseason, Hickey joined the Chicago Cubs as their pitching coach, coming along with two new coaches. Hickey reunited with manager Joe Maddon as the two were together at Tampa Bay until 2014. Hickey replaced Chris Bosio, who had been with the Cubs the past six seasons. Hickey did not return to the Cubs after the 2018 season. In May 2019, Hickey joined the Los Angeles Dodgers as a special assistant in player development.

In October 2020 it was announced that Hickey would join the Washington Nationals as their pitching coach for the 2021 season.

References

External links

Baseball Cube
MLB Profile

Living people
1961 births
Acereros de Monclova players
All-American college baseball players
American expatriate baseball players in Mexico
Appleton Foxes players
Baseball coaches from Illinois
Baseball players from Chicago
Birmingham Barons players
Buffalo Bisons (minor league) players
Chicago Cubs coaches
Columbus Mudcats players
Daytona Beach Admirals players
Glens Falls White Sox players
Houston Astros coaches
Major League Baseball pitching coaches
Mexican League baseball pitchers
Niagara Falls Sox players
San Antonio Missions players
Sultanes de Monterrey players
Tampa Bay Devil Rays coaches
Tampa Bay Rays coaches
UT Rio Grande Valley Vaqueros baseball players